Reverend Ferdinand Kittel was a Lutheran priest and indologist with the Basel Mission in south India and worked in Mangalore, Madikeri and Dharwad in Karnataka. He is most famous for his studies of the Kannada language and for producing a Kannada-English dictionary of about 70,000 words in 1894. He also composed numerous Kannada poems.

Early life
Kittel was born 7 April 1832 in Resterhafe, East Frisia, off the northwestern coast of Germany.  The father Gottfried Christian Kittel was Gaz Freit, a priest. Mother Tudov Helen Hubert. Kittel was the eldest of his five children. His education was praised by the headmaster as "Never Less Than Good." He joined the Basel Mission as the desire of his father.

In India
Kittel learned Hebrew, Greek, Latin, French and English. He arrived in India in 1853. As a missionary, he endeavoured to follow Paul's first Epistle to the Corinthians and "become as an Indian unto the Indians".

Having a strong desire to learn Kannada, he undertook exhaustive studies learning the Kannada language, customs and local music. This earned rebuke from the Basel Mission, where he was already an outsider on account of his North German origin and academic education (the other missionaries were chiefly from southwest Germany and the lower/middle classes, though Gottfried Weigle had studied at Tübingen). This marginalised him by pushing him to a remote station in the Nilgiris and later confining him to the mission's press in Mangalore. He returned to Germany, but visited India again in his fifties to complete his dictionary, which by then had become for him an end in itself, and not merely an instrument secondary to missionary work.

Contribution to Kannada
Kittel worked in Mangalore, Madikeri and Dharwad in Karnataka, inspired by and attracted to Kannada Literature.

He is most famous for his studies of the Kannada language and for producing a Kannada-English dictionary of about 70,000 words in 1894. (Many Kannada-language dictionaries had existed at least since poet Ranna's 'Ranna Khanda' in the tenth century.) Kittel also composed numerous Kannada poems.

In 1862, Kittel, published his Kannada poem `Kathamale' which presented the life of Jesus Christ in the form of Indian musical metre style.  Kittel also wrote a book on Kannada grammar called A Grammar of the Kannada Language: Comprising the Three Dialects of the language. He translated Nagavarma's work on Kannada prosody.

Contemporary recognition
Kittel is today almost forgotten in Germany, but is still widely recognised in Karnataka. Many educational institutions have been named after him. A statue at the end of Mahatma Gandhi road in the city of Bangalore commemorates him. Austin Town in Bangalore was renamed "Kittel Nagar".

Legacy
The book An Indian to the Indians? On the Initial Failure and the Posthumous Success of the Missionary Ferdinand Kittel (1832–1903), edited by Reinhard Wendt, describes various aspects of his work.

See also
 Herman Gundert
 Kannada language
 Kannada grammar
 Shabdamanidarpana
 Thomas Hodson
 William Reeve
 Hermann Mögling
 Njattyela Sreedharan

References

External links
 Ferdinand Kittel and the Cultural Dialogue with India, International Seminar, Germany 2003
 Portrait of Kittel at Kamat's Potpourri

East Frisians
Lexicographers
Protestant missionaries in India
Dravidologists
Christian clergy from Mangalore
1832 births
1903 deaths
Linguists of Kannada
Translators of the Bible into Kannada
19th-century translators
German Protestant missionaries
German expatriates in India
Missionary linguists
19th-century lexicographers